Babyland General Hospital is the fictional  "birthplace" of the dolls known as the Cabbage Patch Kids and is located in Cleveland, Georgia. Xavier Roberts converted a former clinic into a retail facility for the sale of his dolls, originally called "Little People." It is presented as a birthing, nursery, and adoption center for premium Cabbage Patch Kids.  Although the fad surrounding the dolls has largely died down, this site attracts numerous serious fans and curiosity seekers.

New location
The Babyland General Hospital looked to move into a new $2.5 million location in either Helen or Cleveland as revealed in the White County News Telegraph. Cleveland was decided on as the new site and it opened in the spring of 2009.

References

External links
 Babyland General Hospital

Fictional hospitals
1980s toys
Buildings and structures in White County, Georgia
Dollmakers
Tourist attractions in White County, Georgia